Harry Williams (born 1 October 1991) is an English rugby union player for Premiership Rugby side Exeter Chiefs. His position of choice is tight-head prop. He joined Exeter Chiefs from Jersey Reds ahead of the 2015–16 season.

Williams made his England debut against Argentina on 10 June 2017.

Early life

Williams was born on 1 October 1991 and grew up in Crystal Palace in South London, where his father worked as a bricklayer and his mother as a landscape gardener. He attended Whitgift School in Croydon along with fellow professional rugby players Elliot Daly and Marland Yarde. After leaving school he spent six months at North Shore Rugby Club in New Zealand, before enlisting on an English and sports science degree at Loughborough University, where he also joined the student Rugby Club.

Career

While still a student, Williams was a member of the London Wasps academy, but it was not until he spent a season each first at Nottingham and then at Jersey Reds that he was picked regularly in the squad. In 2015, he was scouted by Rob Baxter at the Exeter Chiefs who signed him and started his Premiership career. He started the final as Exeter Chiefs defeated Wasps to be crowned champions of the 2016-17 English Premiership.

Due to the ongoing British and Irish Lions tour to New Zealand, Williams was selected for a depleted England squad to tour to Argentina in 2017. Williams made his England debut, starting against Argentina on 10 June 2017 when England won 38-34. Williams lasted 61 minutes before being replaced by fellow rookie Will Collier. Williams was retained as a starter for the second test, with England going on to win the two-test series. After impressive performances against Argentina, Williams was retained for the end-of-year tests by Head Coach Eddie Jones.

In January 2018, Williams was named as a part of the 35-man squad for the 2018 Six Nations Championship. At 20 st 11 lbs (132 kg), he was the heaviest player competing in the tournament. Williams made three appearances off the bench in the competition, with regular occupant of the bench Kyle Sinckler serving a suspension.

Personal life

Williams resides in Aylesbeare in Devon and his interests include baking and electronic music. His younger sister Matilda has represented Great Britain at Water Polo.

References

External links
ESPN profile
Career stats at Statbunker

Living people
1991 births
English rugby union players
England international rugby union players
Rugby union props
Loughborough Students RUFC players
Wasps RFC players
Nottingham R.F.C. players
Jersey Reds players
Exeter Chiefs players
Rugby union players from London
People educated at Whitgift School